Engineer's blue (also known as scraping blue, Prussian blue, or simply bluing) is a highly pigmented paste used to assist in the mating of two or more components.

History
Joseph Whitworth popularized the first practical method of making accurate flat surfaces, during the 1830s, by using engineer's blue and scraping techniques on three trial surfaces. Prior to his scraping technique, the same three plate method was employed using polishing techniques, giving less accurate results. This improvement led to an explosion of development of precision instruments using these flat surface generation techniques as a basis for further construction of precise shapes.

Preparation
Engineer's blue is prepared by mixing Prussian blue with a non-drying oily material (for example, grease). The coloured oil is rubbed onto a reference surface, and the workpiece is then rubbed against the coloured reference; the transfer (by contact) of the pigment indicates the position of high spots on the workpiece or conversely highlight low points. This method has been used to test the flatness of surfaces and the trueness of a bearing assembly.

The fitter may be told to "blue it up" when using this piece of equipment.

Use in toolmaking
Prussian blue is widely used by tool makers when the core and cavity of a mould is matched during final assembly. It is also used in other tooling applications, especially during assembly, such as stamping tools and pressure die casting tools. A thin coating of Prussian blue is applied (usually with a paint brush) on the "insert", regardless of the shape or contour, of the mould or tool before the matching is done with the mating part. If the Prussian blue (generally called just "blue") appears evenly on the mating area, it is considered, by the tool makers, as "good matching", indicating a good final product from the tool. Usually no tool would be transferred to testing or production without "blue matching", (a term generally used by tool makers in Asia). Prussian blue is considered as an integral part of precision tool making.

References

Inorganic pigments
Metalworking measuring instruments